Ro-46 was an Imperial Japanese Navy Kaichū type submarine of the K6 sub-class. Completed and commissioned in February 1944, she served in World War II, including operations related to the Marianas campaign, the Philippines campaign, and the Battle of Okinawa. She disappeared in April 1945 during her fifth war patrol.

Design and description
The submarines of the K6 sub-class were versions of the preceding K5 sub-class with greater range and diving depth. They displaced  surfaced and  submerged.

For surface running, the boats were powered by two  diesel engines, each driving one propeller shaft. When submerged each propeller was driven by a  electric motor. They could reach  on the surface and  underwater.

The boats were armed with four internal bow  torpedo tubes and carried a total of ten torpedoes. They were also armed with a single  L/40 anti-aircraft gun and two single  AA guns.

Construction and commissioning

Ro-46 was laid down as Submarine No. 387 on 13 June 1942 by Mitsubishi Heavy Industries at Kobe, Japan. She was renamed Ro-46 on 5 February 1943 and was attached provisionally to the Maizuru Naval District that day. She was launched on 23 May 1943 and was completed and commissioned on 19 February 1944.

Service history
Upon commissioning, Ro-46 was attached formally to the Maizuru Naval District. She called at Tokuyama to refuel from 28 to 29 March 1944. During a workup cruise, she was involved in an underwater collision with the submarine  in the Iyo-nada in the Seto Inland Sea off Minase Light at 21:45 on 2 April 1944, suffering damage to her conning tower.

First war patrol

On 23 June 1944, Ro-46 was reassigned to Submarine Division 34 in the 6th Fleet, and she departed Kure, Japan, to begin her first war patrol, assigned a patrol area in the Mariana Islands off Saipan, where the Battle of Saipan had been raging since 15 June. U.S. forces attacked and damaged her on 3 July 1944, forcing her to return to Kure on 8 July 1944 for repairs.

Second war patrol

With her repairs complete, Ro-46 set out from Kure on 19 September 1944 to begin her second war patrol, assigned a patrol area southwest of Palau. She sighted a United States Navy aircraft carrier on 28 September 1944, but was too far away to attack. She sighted another aircraft carrier on 1 October 1944, but again did not attack.

On 2 October 1944, Ro-46 received orders to join the submarine  in a reconnaissance of the American fleet anchorage at Ulithi Atoll, with Ro-46 approaching the atoll from the west while I-177 approached it from the east. The information they gathered was intended to support the first kaiten suicide attack torpedo operation against the anchorage. Ro-46 made her periscope reconnaissance of the anchorage on 7 October, reporting the aircraft carrier , two heavy cruisers, and their escorts there. She returned to Kure on 14 October 1944.

Third war patrol

On 13 October 1944, the day before Ro-46′s arrival at Kure, the Combined Fleet activated Operation Shō-Gō 1 for the defense of the Philippine Islands. The Philippines campaign and the Battle of Leyte began with the U.S. landings on Leyte on 20 October 1944, and that day Ro-46 got back underway from Kure for her third war patrol, ordered to operate as part of Submarine Group B and assigned a patrol area in the Philippine Sea east of the Philippines. The Japanese naval reaction to the invasion of Leyte resulted in the Battle of Leyte Gulf of 23–26 October 1944. Ro-46 saw no action during the battle, and on 7 November 1944 the 6th Fleet ordered all submarines in the Philippines area to return to Japan. On 13 November 1944, during her voyage to Japan, Ro-46 rescued the pilot of an Imperial Japanese Army Air Force Nakajima Ki-43 Hayabusa ("Peregrine Falcon"; Allied reporting name "Oscar") fighter shot down during combat over Manila. She arrived at Maizuru on 19 November 1944.

Fourth war patrol

On 8 January 1945, Ro-46 put to sea from Kure for her fourth war patrol, with a patrol area in the South China Sea west of Luzon. U.S. forces entered Lingayen Gulf and U.S. forces began their invasion of Luzon on 9 January 1945.

Ro-46 arrived at Takao on Formosa on 4 February 1945.

At Takao, Ro-46′s orders were modified to require her to transport fuel and ammunition to the Japanese forces fighting on Luzon, rescue at least 40 pilots from Batulinao, then proceed directly to Sasebo, Japan. She departed Takao on 7 February 1945 and arrived at Batulinao just before midnight on 10 February. After unloading her cargo into Daihatsu-class landing craft operated by the Imperial Japanese Army, she embarked 46 pilots and got back underway the same night. She transported the pilots to Takao, which she reached on 12 February 1945.

On 13 February 1945, Ro-46 departed Takao to return to Japan, ordered to conduct a reconnaissance of the Ryukyu Islands while en route. She arrived at Kure on 19 February 1945.

Fifth war patrol
Ro-46 got underway from Kure on 6 April 1945 for her fifth war patrol, assigned a patrol area northeast of Kitadaitōjima, which lies in the southern Ryukyu Islands southeast of Okinawa, where the Battle of Okinawa had begun on 1 April 1945. The Japanese never heard from her again.

Loss
The circumstances of the loss of Ro-46 remain unknown. Some sources credit the U.S. Navy submarine  with sinking her northeast of Wake Island on 18 April 1945, but Ro-46 was operating far from Wake Island and the Japanese submarine Sea Owl attacked was  — which survived the attack.

On 2 May 1945, the Imperial Japanese Navy declared Ro-46 to be presumed lost in the Okinawa area with all 86 men on board. She was stricken from the Navy list on 10 June 1945.

Notes

References
 

 

Ro-35-class submarines
Kaichū type submarines
Ships built by Mitsubishi Heavy Industries
1943 ships
Japanese submarines lost during World War II
World War II submarines of Japan
World War II shipwrecks in the Pacific Ocean
Maritime incidents in April 1944
Maritime incidents in April 1945
Missing submarines of World War II
Ships lost with all hands